Barrows Green may refer to the following locations in England:
 Barrow's Green, Cheshire
 Barrows Green, Cumbria 
 Barrows Green, Nottinghamshire